The First Horizon Bank Tower (Formerly First National Bank Building and First Tennessee Bank Building) is a high-rise office building  in Memphis, Tennessee. 

The building's namesake is its main tenant First Horizon Bank. It is currently the seventh tallest building in the city. Light panels adorn the sides of the building, which are used to illuminate various images on the side of the building at night.

History 
The site was originally occupied by the Goodwyn Institute, an institutional office building completed in 1927. Construction of the building began in 1961 and was completed in 1964. Its formal ribbon-cutting ceremony occurred on March 22, 1964, and former state senator Lewis Taliaferro making the first transaction at the building.

References 

Skyscraper office buildings in Memphis, Tennessee
Office buildings completed in 1964
International style architecture in Tennessee
1964 establishments in Tennessee